Mohari Junction railway station is a small railway station in Dholpur district, Rajasthan.

Administration
The station code is MHF. It serves Khauri Ibrahimpur village and comes under the administrative limit of Agra railway division of North Central Railway zone.

Structure
The station consists of one platform, which is not well sheltered. It lacks many facilities including water and sanitation.

Location
Mohari Junction is a small railway station having one platform and situated about 0.5 km from the State Highway 43.

Mohari railway station was part of Dholpur Railway metre-gauge line which was owned by Maharaja Rana of Dholpur State and opened in February 1908.

The railway line starts at Dholpur city and after Mohari Junction, it bifurcates in two, one towards Tantpur town and the other towards Sarmathura.

See also 
 Dholpur–Sarmathura Railway

References

Railway junction stations in Rajasthan
Agra railway division
Railway stations opened in 1908
1908 establishments in India
Railway stations in Dholpur district